The RoboSeed Nano is the first monocopter UAV that has demonstrated controllable flight.

Development
The Nano was developed from research on flight characteristics of the Samara seed, coupled with modern small scale remote control electronics and research on controllability of monocopter vehicles. The aircraft is powered by a 2 cell 920mAh LiPoly Battery.

Specifications (Nano)

References

External links
 RoboSeed company website
Youtube video

Unmanned aerial vehicles of the United States